Blagoja Kitanovski (born 14 July 1962) is a football coach from North Macedonia.

Playing career

Club
Born in Bitola, Kitanovski started playing at FK Pelister in the Yugoslav Second League, and had a football career that included playing in Yugoslav First League clubs FK Radnički Niš and FK Vojvodina beside a season in Spanish La Liga with CE Sabadell FC.

Managerial career
After retiring, he became a coach. He coached the Macedonian under-21 national team in 1999. Afterwards he was the main coach of Pelister, Tikveš, Sloga and Milano.

References

External links
 
 Blagoja Kitanovski at UEFA.com

1962 births
Living people
Sportspeople from Bitola
Association football midfielders
Yugoslav footballers
Macedonian footballers
FK Pelister players
FK Radnički Niš players
CE Sabadell FC footballers
FK Vojvodina players
Yugoslav Second League players
Yugoslav First League players
La Liga players
Yugoslav expatriate footballers
Macedonian expatriate footballers
Expatriate footballers in Spain
Yugoslav expatriate sportspeople in Spain
Macedonian expatriate sportspeople in Spain
Macedonian football managers
North Macedonia national under-21 football team managers
GFK Tikvesh managers
FK Osogovo managers
FK Pelister managers
FK Sloga Jugomagnat managers
FK Milano Kumanovo managers